The 1896 Mercer Baptists football team represented Mercer University as a member of the Southern Intercollegiate Athletic Association (SIAA) during the 1896 college football season. They finished with a record of 0–2–1 and were outscored by their opponents 16–64.

Schedule

References

Mercer
Mercer Bears football seasons
College football winless seasons
Mercer Baptists football